Wolfe's Neck Center for Agriculture & the Environment (formerly Wolfe's Neck Farm) is a sustainable coastal farm in Freeport, Maine, United States. Located at 184 Burnett Road, the farm was established in 1959 by Philadelphia natives Eleanor Houston Smith (1910–1987) and Lawrence Smith (1902–1975).

The farm was given to the University of Southern Maine by Eleanor Smith in 1985. Twelve years later, Wolfe's Neck Farm Foundation took over the management of the property.

The Wishcamper Livestock Education Barn was built in 2017 where a barn, torn down in 2008, previously stood. An organic dairy barn, built at a cost of $1 million, opened in May 2019.

Wolfe's Neck Farm was renamed Wolfe's Neck Center for Agriculture & the Environment in October 2017.

In 2019, Wolfe's Neck Center received a donation of $25,000 from Kennebec Savings Bank "to support enhancements to its facilities."

Gallery

References

External links
Wolfe's Neck Center

Farms in Cumberland County, Maine
Buildings and structures in Freeport, Maine
Tourist attractions in Cumberland County, Maine
Education in Cumberland County, Maine
1959 establishments in Maine